Edgar Smith may refer to:

Edgar Smith Wigg (1818–1899), Australian bookseller
Edgar Albert Smith (1847–1916), British zoologist
Edgar Fahs Smith (1854–1928), American scientist
Edgar Smith (librettist), Edgar McPhail Smith (1857–1938), American writer and lyricist
Edgar Smith (outfielder), Albert Edgar Smith (born 1860), baseball player
Edgar Smith (pitcher/outfielder), Edgar Eugene Smith 1862–1892), baseball player
Edgar Lawrence Smith (1882–1971), economist, investment manager and author
Edgar Charles Bate-Smith (1900–1989), English chemist
Eddie Smith (pitcher), Edgar Smith (1913–1994), baseball player
Heber Smith, Heber Edgar Smith (1915–1990), Canadian politician
Edgar Smith (murderer), Edgar Herbert Smith (1934–2017), American convicted murderer
Edgar Smith (rower), Canadian Olympic rower
Edgar Smith (poet), Dominican poet

See also
Ed Smith (disambiguation)